The Indus-Yarlung suture zone or the Indus-Yarlung Tsangpo suture is a tectonic suture in southern Tibet and across the north margin of the Himalayas which resulted from the collision between the Indian plate and the Eurasian plate starting about 52 Ma. The north side of the suture zone is the Ladakh Batholith of the Karakoram-Lhasa Block. The rocks of the suture zone consist of an ophiolite mélanges composed of Neotethys oceanic crustal flyschs and ophiolites; the Dras Volcanics: which are basalts, dacites and minor radiolarian cherts – the remains of a mid- to late Mesozoic volcanic island arc; and the Indus Molasse which are an Eocene or later continental clastic sediments.

The ophiolite which can be found here is not a remnant of a very big ocean, but of a small  back-arc basin structure.

See also

References

Plate tectonics
Geology of the Himalaya
Suture zones